Fresh Sunday is a Chinese cooking-variety show hosted by popular host He Jiong and Chinese Got7 member Jackson Wang.
It aired every Sunday on Hunan TV

References

Hunan Television original programming
Mandarin-language television shows
Chinese cooking television series
Chinese variety television shows